Orange is a wine region and Australian Geographical Indication in the Central Ranges zone in the Australian state of New South Wales. It is named for the town of Orange and defined as the contiguous area that is above  elevation within the City of Orange, Cabonne Shire and Blayney Shire.

Grape vines were first planted commercially in 1980. The region is defined to be above the  contour line.

Wineries in Orange

Wineries that use Orange region grapes in their wines include Brokenwood Wines (Hunter Valley based), Logan (Mudgee), Tamburlaine (Hunter Valley), Gartelmann (Hunter Valley), Carillon Wines, Windowrie (Central Ranges), Eloquesta (Mudgee) and Lowe Wines (Mudgee).  In 2007, South Australian based Penfolds winery released the 2007 Penfolds Bin 311 Orange Region Chardonnay.

References

Wine regions of New South Wales
City of Orange